Dustin James Brown (born November 4, 1984) is an American former professional ice hockey right winger. Brown spent his entire NHL career with the Los Angeles Kings of the National Hockey League (NHL), who drafted him 13th overall in the 2003 NHL Entry Draft. He is the Kings all-time games leader and served as team captain from 2008 to 2016; during this time he led the Kings to the 2012 and 2014 Stanley Cup championships, becoming the first Kings captain and second American captain (behind Derian Hatcher) to win the Stanley Cup. During the 2012–13 NHL lockout, he played for ZSC Lions in the Swiss National League A.

Brown was noted for his physical playing style, consistently ranking among NHL leaders in hits and penalties drawn, and his reserved, lead-by-example approach to his captaincy of the Kings.

Internationally, Brown has represented the United States at three World Championships, winning a bronze medal in 2004, and two World Junior Championships. He won a silver medal as an alternate captain of the United States national team at the 2010 Winter Olympics. Brown received the 2011 NHL Foundation Player Award for his extensive charity work in the Los Angeles community.

Playing career

Junior career
After playing hockey at Ithaca High School for two years, Brown left his hometown to play junior hockey at age 16. He was drafted in the second round, 26th overall, by the Guelph Storm in the Ontario Hockey League (OHL) Priority Selection Draft. Brown played three seasons for Guelph, scoring 194 points in 174 games. He was drafted by the Los Angeles Kings in the first round, 13 overall, in 2003.

Los Angeles Kings (2003–2022)

2003–04 season
Brown signed a three-year entry level contract with the Kings and made the Kings' 2003–04 team out of training camp. His first NHL game was October 9, 2003, against the Detroit Red Wings. Brown saw fourth-line ice time in his rookie year, and he scored his first NHL goal on November 22, 2003 in a 2–0 win over the Colorado Avalanche. He managed just 1 goal and 5 points in 31 games before his season was cut short by a high ankle sprain. Nonetheless, Brown's physicality made a favorable impression with the Kings' coaching staff.

Lockout, 2005–06 season
The following season was cancelled due to the NHL lockout. Brown was assigned to the Manchester Monarchs, the Kings' American Hockey League (AHL) affiliate, in order to develop his offensive game. He performed well in Manchester, averaging nearly a point per game and readying himself for an expanded NHL role.

With the lockout over, and NHL play resuming in 2005–06, Brown cemented his place on the team. As a 21-year-old checking forward, he managed 28 points in 79 games. More impressively, he led the team (and ranked 13th in the NHL) with 175 hits, and he drew the second most penalties in the NHL despite his limited ice time. A restricted free agent at the end of the year, Brown signed a two-year contract before the start of the 2006–07 season.

2006–07 season
Brown's third season saw an expansion in his role, as he was placed on the top line with star rookie center Anže Kopitar. The two young forwards became frequent linemates, as Brown's hitting abilities and willingness to shoot complemented Kopitar's dynamic passing and puck possession skills. Receiving the third-most ice time among Kings forwards, Brown responded with career-highs of 17 goals and 46 points in 81 games. Brown also received the most short-handed ice time among Kings forwards, a sign of his growing defensive reliability. He finished second in the NHL in hits, the first of six consecutive years that he ranked top three in the NHL in that category.

2007–08 season

On October 26, 2007, shortly after the start of the 2007–08 season, the Kings and Brown agreed to a six-year, $19.05 million contract extension that ran through the 2013–14 season. The contract was signed a full year before Brown hit restricted free agency, partially because young forwards Dustin Penner of the Anaheim Ducks and Thomas Vanek of the Buffalo Sabres had just received lucrative offer sheets in restricted free agency, and the Kings did not want Brown to receive one. Brown produced his best offensive season that year. Continuing to play top-line minutes with Kopitar, he recorded 33 goals and 60 points. To date, that season remains the only year Brown has managed to reach the 30-goal plateau. Despite his personal success, the rebuilding Kings missed the Stanley Cup playoffs for the fifth-straight year.

2008–09 season
The Kings named Brown the 13th captain in team history on October 8, 2008, just after the start of the 2008–09 season. Brown's appointment filled the vacancy created when prior captain Rob Blake left the Kings in free agency to sign with the San Jose Sharks on July 3, 2008. Just 23 years old when he assumed the captaincy, Brown became the youngest captain and the only American captain in Kings history. Head coach Terry Murray pointed to Brown's work ethic and commitment to the Kings to explain the decision, saying Brown "shows that he cares tremendously about this team, about winning every night. I just want him to follow through with that, and he will because that's his personality. Just keep blazing that trail, and players on the team will follow". Kings management was impressed by Brown's emergence as a vocal leader in the locker room, especially after the departure of veteran presences Mattias Norström and Rob Blake. On the ice, Brown's numbers dipped slightly from 2007–08, in part because of an 8.2% shooting percentage, his lowest since his rookie season. However, his 292 shots led the team, and his 24 goals were third. Brown was chosen to represent the Western Conference at the 2009 All-Star Game. The Kings missed the playoffs for a franchise-worst sixth straight year.

2009–10 season
Brown again posted solid numbers in 2009–10, playing a full 82 games for the first time and registering 24 goals and a career-high 32 assists. He scored his 100th NHL goal on January 14, 2010, against the Anaheim Ducks. With Brown leading a rapidly improving young core that included center Anže Kopitar, defenseman Drew Doughty and goaltender Jonathan Quick, the Kings finally snapped the six-year playoff drought. Brown had one goal and four assists in six games as the Kings lost in the first round of the 2010 Stanley Cup playoffs to the Vancouver Canucks.

2010–11 season
Brown and the Kings entered the 2010–11 season with higher expectations. Brown again played all 82 games and scored 28 goals. Anže Kopitar's late season ankle injury forced the Kings to settle for a seventh-seeded finish in the Western Conference and a matchup with the San Jose Sharks. The Kings lost in six games for the second straight year, with Brown recording two points in the series, no points in the last three games.

2011–12 season and first Stanley Cup
Brown began the 2011–12 season on a line with newly acquired center Mike Richards, but was shuffled throughout the lineup for most of the season. He maintained his consistent production, topping 20 goals and 50 points for the fifth-straight year. However, along with the rest of the Kings, he struggled to score in the first half of the season. Head coach Terry Murray was fired midway through the season, and as the Kings fell further out of the playoff picture, they were rumored to be listening to trade offers for Brown. New head coach Darryl Sutter called the Brown-Kopitar tandem "stale" and said Brown was not playing the "straight-line, up-and-down, go-to-the-net, shoot-the-puck, run-over-people" style Brown needed to be effective. Brown's scoring pace picked up amidst the trade rumors, and he scored three goals and an assist in the last game before the NHL trade deadline, a 4–0 win over the Chicago Blackhawks. The Kings retained Brown, who responded with 11 points in the 9 games following the trade deadline. Brown later said he was playing with "a chip on his shoulder" and "whether those rumors are true or not, they're still out there, it gives you maybe a bit more motivation". With Brown producing and the trade-deadline acquisition of Jeff Carter, the Kings were one of the highest-scoring NHL teams down the stretch and made the playoffs as an eighth seed. After moving up-and-down the lineup for most of the year, Brown found stability playing on the first line with Anže Kopitar and Justin Williams. That line would remain intact throughout the entire 2012 Stanley Cup playoffs.

Brown recorded four goals and one assist in the first round against the first-seeded Vancouver Canucks, including two shorthanded goals in a 4–2 Game 2 win. Brown is the first and only player as of 2022 with two shorthanded goals in a playoff game. In Game 3, he delivered a devastating open-ice check to Canucks captain Henrik Sedin directly in front of the Canucks' bench. The hit left Sedin dazed on the ice for several seconds. Brown later scored the game-winning goal in the third period. Many observers, including TSN's Bob McKenzie and Sports Illustrated''' Michael Farber, called the hit the decisive moment in the series. The Kings upset the heavily favored Canucks in five games, and then recorded the first sweep in franchise history over the St. Louis Blues. Brown registered two goals and four assists in the series. Both of his goals came in the decisive Game 4, a 3–1 Kings victory.

The Kings then beat the Phoenix Coyotes in five games in the Western Conference Finals. Brown scored the game-winning goal in Game 1 of that series and did not score again until Game 6 of the 2012 Stanley Cup Final against the New Jersey Devils, although he did manage five assists in that span. After being benched for the final minutes of a Game 5 loss, Brown produced three points in Game 6 to secure the Kings' first-ever Stanley Cup. He scored the first of three goals on a five-minute power play, and shortly afterwards, fired a shot that Jeff Carter deflected into the net for the eventual Cup-winning goal. Later, he assisted on another Carter goal. The Kings defeated the Devils 6–1, making Brown the second American-born captain to lead a team to a Stanley Cup championship and the Kings the second California-based team to win the Stanley Cup. With 8 goals and 12 assists in 20 games, Brown tied teammate Anže Kopitar for the lead in overall playoff point total.

On July 28, 2012, Brown had his "Day with the Cup". Each year after a team has won the Stanley Cup, players, front office and hockey operation staff each get a day with the Stanley Cup. Brown hinted on the Tonight Show with Jay Leno'' he would bring the Cup back home. He did just that, bringing it to Ithaca High School in late July.

2012–13 season
During the lockout-shortened season, Brown finished with 18 goals and 29 points in 46 games. The Kings reached the Western Conference Finals for a second-straight year, but fell in five games to the Blackhawks.

2013–14 season and second Stanley Cup
On July 18, 2013, the Kings signed Brown to an eight-year, $47 million contract extension. In the 2014 Stanley Cup Finals, Brown led the Kings to another Stanley Cup title, despite facing some criticism for more muted contributions on the team's run to the title. In the Finals against the New York Rangers, Brown scored the overtime winner in Game 2 to give the Kings a 5–4 victory and a 2–0 series lead, and he scored again during the Kings' 2–1 loss in Game 4.

At the conclusion of the 2013–14 season, Brown was awarded the Mark Messier Leadership Award "in recognition of his commitment and service to charities in his community".

Later years
Following back-to-back seasons of scoring less than 30 points, Brown was replaced as the Kings captain by Anže Kopitar on June 16, 2016. Speaking on the decision to have his captaincy stripped, Brown stated, "I understand the decision and I respect the decision. Part of my problem was how it was handled. It just put me in an awkward spot."

The 2017–18 season marked a resurgence for Brown. After earning 36 points the season prior, Brown managed 28 goals and a career-high 61 points. On December 21, 2017, Brown played in his 1,000th career NHL game. The Kings defeated the Colorado Avalanche 2–1 in overtime, where Brown scored the game-winning goal. On April 5, 2018, Brown scored four goals, including the overtime winner, against the Minnesota Wild.

Brown announced on April 28, 2022 that he would retire after the completion of the 2022 Stanley Cup playoffs, for which his Kings team qualified. At the time of the announcement, Brown had 28 points in 63 games. In tribute, he was named team captain for the Kings’ final game of the season, a matchup against the Canucks. Brown's Kings would be eliminated in seven games in the first round by the Edmonton Oilers, with Brown skating in all seven appearances and recording two points, his final game was on May 14.

Brown was honored with a statue on February 11, 2023, joining Wayne Gretzky and Luc Robitaille as the only Kings players with statues, as well having his jersey number hanging in the rafters of Staples Center.

International play

Brown has played for the United States in multiple international tournaments. During the World Championship tournament of 2008, Brown received negative attention for a controversial hit that made contact with the head of Finnish player Jussi Jokinen as the final horn sounded.

Brown was named an alternate captain of the United States at the 2010 Winter Olympics and again in 2014.

Style of play
Brown was known for his physical, north–south style of game. Brown considered himself a clean hitter: after a controversial hit on Phoenix Coyotes defenseman Michal Rozsíval in the 2012 Western Conference Finals, Brown defended himself by saying, "I take pride in playing the game clean and hard. There are going to be hits that are unfortunate but still clean." Brown had never been issued a fine or suspension from the NHL Department of Player Safety until April 24, 2013, when he received two-game suspension for an illegal elbow to the head of Minnesota Wild forward Jason Pominville on April 23, 2013. Brown's former teammate Rob Blake said Brown "comes at guys straight on, face-to-face. He goes right through guys." Despite his aggressive style, Brown did not miss a game due to injury over a span of four seasons. Brown was one of the most effective NHL players at drawing penalties, having led the NHL in that category in five of seven post-lockout seasons. Brown's unparalleled success in that area led several commentators, including ex-NHL referee Kerry Fraser, to say that Brown acquired a reputation for embellishing infractions in order to draw penalties. Beyond his physicality and agitation, Brown provided a consistent offensive threat for the Kings, scoring at least 22 goals for five consecutive years. Brown played an effective two-way game and matured into an elite defensive and penalty-killing forward.

Personal life
Brown has three sons, Jake, Mason and Cooper, and one daughter, Mackenzie, with his wife Nicole and lives in Manhattan Beach, California. Brown had a speech impediment early in his career, which he received therapy for before his professional career. He is heavily involved in charity work in the Greater Los Angeles Area and was awarded the 2011 NHL Foundation Player Award for his community efforts and involvement.

Career statistics

Regular season and playoffs
Bold indicates led league

International

Awards and honours

References

External links
 
 

1984 births
American men's ice hockey right wingers
Guelph Storm players
Ice hockey players from New York (state)
Ice hockey players at the 2010 Winter Olympics
Ice hockey players at the 2014 Winter Olympics
Living people
Los Angeles Kings draft picks
Los Angeles Kings players
Manchester Monarchs (AHL) players
Medalists at the 2010 Winter Olympics
National Hockey League first-round draft picks
Olympic silver medalists for the United States in ice hockey
Sportspeople from Ithaca, New York
Stanley Cup champions
ZSC Lions players
Ithaca High School (Ithaca, New York) alumni